The Musso War (or War of Musso) was an armed conflict between the federation of the Three Leagues, which functioned as an associate state of the Old Swiss Confederacy, and the Duchy of Milan early in the 16th century. The conflict took place in two phases, the First Musso War (1524–26) and the Second Musso War (1531–32).

The Milanese reeve of Como, Gian Giacomo Medici, who resided in castle of Musso, had been raiding the valley of Chiavenna since 1521. In 1524, in alliance with the Prince-Bishopric of Chur, he attempted to conquer the Three Leagues. In 1525 his forces were defeated at the Battle of Morbegno but he remained in control of Chiavenna. Following the battle, the Three Leagues sent a delegation headed by Gian Travers to negotiate a peace treaty with the city of Milan. However, while en route they were captured and imprisoned by Medici in September 1525. Due to religious conflicts following the Reformation, neither the Swiss Confederation nor the Three Leagues were able to move quickly to free the prisoners. In the spring of 1526 a Three Leagues delegation, with the support of France and Venice, were finally able to secure the release of the prisoners, but only after paying a ransom and giving the Tre Pievi or three communes at the north end of Lake Como to Medici.

Due to the weak 1526 treaty, in 1531 Milan attacked again, capturing Morbegno and defeating the League forces in the area. The Three Leagues called the Old Swiss Confederacy for help, calling in duties of a defence alliance concluded earlier. Due to the religious conflicts in the Confederation only the Protestant cantons supported the Three Leagues, while the Catholic cantons insisted that any help was dependent on the Leagues converting back to the old faith. The Protestant and League forces were able to drive the Milanese out of the Valtellina. In a peace treaty concluded the next year, Chiavenna and the Valtellina were granted to the Three Leagues; only the tre pievi came under the supervision of Milan.

The refusal of the Catholic cantons to support the Three Leagues in these skirmishes was taken by the Swiss canton of Zürich as the reason to start the second war of Kappel. The Catholic cantons would emerge victorious from that war and even gain the majority in the confederacy's federal assembly, the Tagsatzung, with far-reaching consequences for the confederacy.

In 1527, Gian Travers wrote an epic account of the war in Romansh verse, Chanzun da la guerra dalg Chiastè d'Müs ("Song of the War of the Castle of Musso").

See also
History of the Grisons
Reformation in Switzerland
Wars of Kappel

References

Military history of Switzerland
Grisons
1520s conflicts
1530s conflicts
Wars involving the Duchy of Milan
16th century in the Old Swiss Confederacy
1520s in the Holy Roman Empire
1530s in the Holy Roman Empire